The Parkdale Methodist Church is a historic church on S. Church Street in Parkdale, Arkansas.  Built out of rubble-faced and smooth concrete blocks that were shaped on site in 1926, it is an architecturally distinctive Plain-Traditional building with Classical Revival elements.  The walls are lined with stained glass windows, and the entry is made through a recessed porch supported by Tuscan columns.

The church was listed on the National Register of Historic Places in 2007.

See also
National Register of Historic Places listings in Ashley County, Arkansas

References

Methodist churches in Arkansas
Churches on the National Register of Historic Places in Arkansas
Neoclassical architecture in Arkansas
Churches completed in 1926
Churches in Ashley County, Arkansas
National Register of Historic Places in Ashley County, Arkansas
1926 establishments in Arkansas
Neoclassical church buildings in the United States